The 2018 Reinert Open was a professional tennis tournament played on outdoor clay courts. It was the eleventh edition of the tournament and was part of the 2018 ITF Women's Circuit. It took place in Versmold, Germany, on 9–15 July 2018.

Singles main draw entrants

Seeds 

 1 Rankings as of 2 July 2018.

Other entrants 
The following players received a wildcard into the singles main draw:
  Katharina Gerlach
  Lena Rüffer
  Laura Siegemund
  Julyette Steur

The following players received entry from the qualifying draw:
  Angelica Moratelli
  Jule Niemeier
  Pemra Özgen
  Katarzyna Piter

Champions

Singles

 Olga Danilović def.  Laura Siegemund, 5–7, 6–1, 6–3

Doubles

 Pemra Özgen /  Despina Papamichail def.  Olga Danilović /  Nina Stojanović, 1–6, 6–2, [10–4]

External links 
 2018 Reinert Open at ITFtennis.com
 Official website

2018 ITF Women's Circuit
Reinert Open
2018 in German tennis
2018 in German women's sport
July 2018 sports events in Germany